Hail to the King may refer to:
 A catchphrase used by Ash Williams from the Evil Dead franchise
 A catchphrase used by Duke Nukem in his namesake video game series
 Evil Dead: Hail to the King, a video game sequel to the Evil Dead film Army of Darkness
 Hail to the King (Avenged Sevenfold album), 2013
 "Hail to the King" (song), 2013
 Hail to the King Tour
 Hail to the King (Hillsong London album), 2008